The 1893 Centre football team represented Centre College as an independent during the 1893 college football season. Led by W. Durant Berry in his third and final season as head coach, Centre compiled a record of 4–1.

Schedule

References

Centre
Centre Colonels football seasons
Centre football